Petra Döll is a German hydrologist whose work focuses on modeling global water resources. She is a professor of hydrology and researcher at the Institute of Physical Geography, Goethe University Frankfurt.

Early life and education 
Petra Döll was born and raised in Hof, Bavaria, Germany, later moving to Erlangen for university. She applied for a Fulbright exchange program between the University of Erlangen–Nuremberg and the University of Colorado Boulder (US) for her fourth year. There, Döll connected her background in geology to groundwater and hydrology. Döll earned a Masters of Science from University of Colorado Boulder. Döll was interested in sustainability and found that her new studies in hydrology gave her the ability to think about geology and water with a social-ecological perspective. After earning her first diploma in geology from University of Erlangen–Nuremberg and her Masters of Science in geology in Colorado, she continued her work at the Technical University of Berlin, modeling moisture movement under the influence of temperature gradients as it pertains to the desiccation of mineral liners beneath landfills to earn her PhD. Several years later, Döll began her research on global and regional modeling of water availability and use at the University of Kassel. Döll earned her habilitation degree from the University of Kassel in Environmental Systems Analysis.

Career and research 
Döll is currently a professor of hydrology and researcher at the Institute of Physical Geography, Goethe University Frankfurt. She has authored or coauthored 93 peer-reviewed articles and has been cited at least 8,574 times, putting her in the top 1% of most highly cited researchers of 2018 as of May 2019 according to Clarivate Analytics. She has two research focuses: global hydrological modeling and smaller scale research on transdisciplinary and participatory research methods.

Global hydrological modeling 
Döll is recognized for her work on the global freshwater model, WaterGAP. This model focuses on quantifying human impacts on the global freshwater system, including impacts of climate change, human water use and man-made reservoirs, and assessing water stress. Döll and her team have collaborated with the Food and Agriculture Organization of the UN to compile global data sets relevant for hydrology pertaining to drainage directions, lakes and wetlands, irrigated areas, and irrigated and rainfed crops. Döll models impacts that climate change and human activity may have on the availability of the world's freshwater supply in the near and far future.

Transdisciplinary and participatory research methods 
In support of the sustainable management of social-ecological systems, mainly water management, Döll spearheads the research and implementation of transdisciplinary and participatory research methods. She believes that sustainable solutions to complex problems can only be achieved by equitable stakeholder participation, and that suitable methods for integrating stakeholder knowledge and values need to be developed.

Other contributions 
Since 2001, Döll has contributed to reports for the Intergovernmental Panel on Climate Change both as a lead author and contributing author on chapters about freshwater resources and their management. Döll was a contributing author to the freshwater resources chapter of the Third Assessment Report: Climate Change 2001. She was the lead author of freshwater resources chapter of the Fourth Assessment Report: Climate Change 2007. In 2008 she was lead author of the IPCC's Technical Paper on Climate and Water. Additionally, Döll was the lead author of another chapter about the water cycle as well as the Summary for Policymakers for the Fifth Assessment Report: Climate Change 2014. She was later a contributing author of a chapter on the water cycle in the Sixth Assessment Report: Climate Change 2021.

Aside from her work with the IPCC, Döll has been a member of the Senate Commission "Earth System Research" of the German Research Foundation since 2016.

Awards and honors 
In 2019, Döll was awarded the Henry Darcy Medal of the European Geophysical Union for her work in global freshwater system modeling, raising awareness about threats to freshwater security, and advocating for and researching participatory water management.

She has also received the following awards:

 eLearning Award of Goethe University (2006)
 Water International Best Paper 2004 Award (2005)
 Fritz Scheffer Award of Deutsche Bodenkundliche Gesellschaft (for Ph.D. thesis) (1996)

Publications 
Döll has authored or coauthored 93 peer reviewed articles and has been cited at least 8,574 times putting her in the top 1% of most highly cited researchers of 2018. The following are her top 10 most cited publications according to Publons:

 Lehner, B., & Döll, P. (2004). Development and validation of a global database of lakes, reservoirs and wetlands. Journal of Hydrology, 296(1-4), 1-22.
 Döll, P., Kaspar, F., & Lehner, B. (2003). A global hydrological model for deriving water availability indicators: model tuning and validation. Journal of Hydrology, 270(1-2), 105–134.
 Taylor, R. G., Scanlon, B., Döll, P., Rodell, M., Van Beek, R., Wada, Y., ... & Konikow, L. (2013). Ground water and climate change. Nature Climate Change, 3(4), 322.
 Lehner, B., Liermann, C. R., Revenga, C., Vörösmarty, C., Fekete, B., Crouzet, P., ... & Nilsson, C. (2011). High‐resolution mapping of the world's reservoirs and dams for sustainable river‐flow management. Frontiers in Ecology and the Environment, 9(9), 494–502.
 Lehner, B., Döll, P., Alcamo, J., Henrichs, T., & Kaspar, F. (2006). Estimating the impact of global change on flood and drought risks in Europe: a continental, integrated analysis. Climatic Change, 75(3), 273–299.
 Portmann, F. T., Siebert, S., & Döll, P. (2010). MIRCA2000—Global monthly irrigated and rainfed crop areas around the year 2000: A new high‐resolution data set for agricultural and hydrological modeling. Global biogeochemical cycles, 24(1).
 Alcamo, J., Döll, P., Henrichs, T., Kaspar, F., Lehner, B., Rösch, T., & Siebert, S. (2003). Development and testing of the WaterGAP 2 global model of water use and availability. Hydrological Sciences Journal, 48(3), 317–337.
 Siebert, S., Burke, J., Faures, J. M., Frenken, K., Hoogeveen, J., Döll, P., & Portmann, F. T. (2010). Groundwater use for irrigation–a global inventory. Hydrology and earth system sciences, 14(10), 1863-1880
 Kundzewicz, Z. W., Mata, L. J., Arnell, N. W., Döll, P., Jimenez, B., Miller, K., ... & Shiklomanov, I. (2008). The implications of projected climate change for freshwater resources and their management. Hydrological sciences journal, 53(1), 3-10.
 Wood, E. F., Roundy, J. K., Troy, T. J., Van Beek, L. P. H., Bierkens, M. F., Blyth, E., ... & Gochis, D. (2011). Hyperresolution global land surface modeling: Meeting a grand challenge for monitoring Earth's terrestrial water. Water Resources Research, 47(5).

References 

Year of birth missing (living people)
Living people
Academic staff of Goethe University Frankfurt
University of Erlangen-Nuremberg alumni
University of Colorado Boulder alumni
German hydrologists
Women hydrologists